The Samuel Sloan House is a historic antebellum home in Hightstown, New Jersey.  It is considered the finest home from the early history of the town.  Its architecture can be described as Carpenter Italianate, with the impressive massing associated with an Italian villa combined with fanciful jigsaw carpentry.  The home was originally thought to have designed by the architect, Samuel Sloan, as that name was found inscribed in a nineteenth century hand on a piece of millwork in the house.  However, further research in 1997 established that the Samuel Sloan who built the home was in fact a local merchant and not the famed architect.

See also
National Register of Historic Places listings in Mercer County, New Jersey

References

National Register of Historic Places in Mercer County, New Jersey
Houses in Mercer County, New Jersey
Hightstown, New Jersey
New Jersey Register of Historic Places